Joplin is an English surname.  Notable people with the surname include:

Frank Joplin (1894–1984), New Zealand cricketer
Germaine Joplin (1903–1989), Australian geologist
Janis Joplin (1943–1970), American singer-songwriter
Jessi Jae Joplin, American singer, model and journalist
Josh Joplin, American singer-songwriter
Larry Joplin (born 1946), American judge
Scott Joplin ( 1867–1917), American ragtime composer
Stan Joplin (born 1957), American basketball coach
Thomas Joplin ( 1790–1847), English timber merchant and banker

Fictional characters
Trudy Joplin, character in television series Miami Vice
Piero Joplin, natural philosopher in the 2012 video game Dishonored

See also
Joplin (disambiguation)
Jopling, related surname

English-language surnames